Piranhea is a plant genus under the family Picrodendraceae described as a genus in 1866.

Piranhea is native to South America and to Mexico.

species
 Piranhea longipedunculata Jabl. - Venezuela, N Brazil
 Piranhea mexicana (Standl.) Radcl.-Sm. - Jalisco, Nayarit, Sinaloa
 Piranhea securinega Radcl.-Sm. & Ratter - Bahia, Goiás, Minas Gerais
 Piranhea trifoliata Baill. - Venezuela, Guyana, Brazil

See also
Taxonomy of the Picrodendraceae

References

Picrodendraceae
Malpighiales genera
Taxa named by Henri Ernest Baillon